Alfredinho is a nickname, a diminute for Alfredo in Portuguese. It may refer to:

 Alfredinho (footballer, 1896-unknown), Brazilian football attacking midfielder
 Alfredinho (footballer, 1927–2017), Brazilian football manager and former winger